Tamaki Nami Reproduct Best is a remix album released by Japanese Pop singer Nami Tamaki on March 25, 2009. The album is a compilation of Tamaki's singles, all remixed. The album has some entirely new remixes as well as some old ones.

Track listing

References

Nami Tamaki albums
2009 remix albums
Sony Music Entertainment Japan remix albums